Laparra is a surname. Notable people with the surname include:

 María Teresa Laparra (1901–1988), Guatemalan activist and First Lady
 Miguel Laparra (born 1962), Spanish politician and sociologist
 Raoul Laparra (1876–1943), French composer
 William Laparra (1873–1920), French painter